Six laws 六法, a multivalent Chinese term, might refer to:

 the lost chapter of the Book of Lord Shang, partially known from quotations
 Six Yogas of Naropa
 Six principles of Chinese painting by Xie He
 Six Codes of law in East Asian countries